WSHL-FM (91.3 FM) is a non-commercial, educational radio station  broadcasting an alternative music format. Licensed to Easton, Massachusetts, United States, the station serves the Greater Brockton-Easton area of Massachusetts, 24/7 in Stereo.  The station is owned by Stonehill College, Inc. and has been operating since January 1974.

WSHL-FM studios and offices are located on the 1st floor of the Roche Dining Commons at Stonehill College.  The transmitter and antenna are located at the College Center Building, also on the campus of Stonehill College in North Easton, Massachusetts.

Currently there are 11 members on the WSHL-FM executive board:
 General manager: Ellen Jones
 Assistant general manager: Jenna Rohlman
 Programming Director: Lauren Walsh
 Music Director: Daniel Cashin
 Associate Music Director: Tanner Walling
 Technical director: Jenna Rohlman
 Underwriting Director: Taylor Whitehouse
 Promotions Director: Bridget Fama
 News Director: Matthew Dias
 Sports director: Chris Cassidy
 Treasurer: Mitchell Juneau

Peter Q. George is the Chief Engineer for the station.
Professor Geoffrey Lantos is the faculty adviser for WSHL-FM.

Summer
During the summer, kids participating in the summer program, College Academy, have the opportunity to take a class where they can broadcast on the radio station.

References

External links

SHL-FM
Radio stations established in 1974
Mass media in Bristol County, Massachusetts
SHL-FM
1974 establishments in Massachusetts
Stonehill College